Kiwani: The Movie is a 2008 Ugandan drama film starring Juliana Kanyomozi, Hannington Bugingo, Allan Tumusiime and Flavia Tumusiime and directed and produced by Henry H. Ssali, a Ugandan journalist. The movie tells a tale of cheap tricks used by thieves and pickpocket on the streets of Uganda's Capital City, Kampala, the lives of university students and corporate personalities entangled.

Cast
 Hannington Bugingo as Kaggwa, a pickpocket and conman
 Allan Tumusiime as Mwesigye, Kaggwa's junior apprentice at pick-pocketing 
 Juliana Kanyomozi as Judith, a desperate lonely corporate woman seeking love online
 Flavia Tumusiime as Pam, a University student and niece to Juliana.

References

External links
 

2008 films
English-language Ugandan films
Swahili-language films
2008 drama films
Films set in Uganda
Films shot in Uganda
Ugandan drama films
2000s English-language films